Gopili is a travel metasearch engine launched in UK in December 2014. The website compiles and presents data on domestic and international travel.

Gopili is the European brand of KelBillet, which is a multimodal travel search engine in France. Gopili’s website is today available in UK, Spain, Germany, Italy and Russia.

The website has headquarters in Rennes, France.

References

External links
 Official website UK
 Official website Spain
 Official website German
 Official website Italy
 Official website Russia

British travel websites
Travel ticket search engines
Transport companies established in 2014
Internet properties established in 2014
2014 establishments in the United Kingdom